The 1968 United States presidential election in Utah took place on November 5, 1968, as part of the 1968 United States presidential election. State voters chose four representatives, or electors, to the Electoral College, who voted for president and vice president.

Utah was won by former Vice President Richard Nixon (R–California), with 56.49 percent of the popular vote, against Vice President Hubert Humphrey (D–Minnesota), with 37.07 percent of the popular vote. American Independent Party candidate George Wallace performed decently, finishing with 6.37 percent of the popular vote. By outpolling Humphrey in arch-Republican Kane County, Wallace became the first third-party candidate to finish even second in any non-Southern county since 1936 when William Lemke finished ahead of Alf Landon in the North Dakota counties of  Bottineau, Burke, Divide, Mountrail, Towner and Williams.

With 56.49 percent of the popular vote, Utah would prove to be Nixon's third strongest state in the 1968 election after Nebraska and Idaho.

Results

Results by county

See also
 United States presidential elections in Utah

Notes

References

Utah
1968
1968 Utah elections